The Library at the Royal Castle is a large building adjacent to the Royal Castle in Warsaw, Poland. It was built between 1779 and 1783 according to design of Dominik Merlini and Jan Chrystian Kamsetzer in order to accommodate the royal collection of books belonging to King Stanisław August Poniatowski, the last King of sovereign Poland.

The Library is an elongated building of total dimensions 56 x 9 m, with 15 windows along the entrance hall, and a terrace at the top. The library initially held about 7,500 items, which grew to about 20,000 volumes in 1795. After the King's death in 1798 the whole collection was sold to Tadeusz Czacki, who bequeathed it to the Liceum Krzemienieckie. Following the collapse of the 1830 November Uprising against the Russian occupation, by order of Tsar Nicholas I of Russia, the library was seized and transported to Kiev where it formed the brand new University Library.

The library holdings
The main reason for founding a library at the Palace, was one of Stanislaus Augustus desire to meet the needs of Polish intellectuals, as well as, the creation of workshops for scientists developing political and economic reforms. The purchase of books from collectors included private libraries of Giuliani, Jan Beniamin Steinhauser, Mateusz Czarnek, Paweł Czempiński and Kajetan Ghigiottim. Some of the main suppliers were Warsaw booksellers: Piotr Dufour, Jan August Poser, Józef Lex, Michał Groell, and Kornów company of Wrocław, but also the Paris warehouse of Saint Len and Jan Franciszek Sellon, and the selected British booksellers. The King often personally directed the purchases and awarded his suppliers with the "Merentibus" gold medal for their efforts including the Parisian bookseller P.P. Piernes.

The collections were divided into departments, including the Philosophy department represented by numerous works of ancient philosophers such as Socrates, Plato, Seneca, and Lucretius; modern (Erasmus, Francis Bacon, Michael Montaigne), mathematicians (Blaise Pascal, and Descartes); French philosophers of the Enlightenment and the Encyclopedists: Jean le Rond d'Alembert, Voltaire, and Jean-Jacques Rousseau. The Fiction department was represented by many works belonging to the classical world, among them: Homer's Iliad and Odyssey, Comedies of Aristophanes, Ovid's Metamorphoses, Lodovico Ariosto's Mad Orland, Cyd by Pierre Corneille, Don Quixote by Miguel de Cervantes, Robinson Crusoe by Daniel Defoe and many others, including the Complete Works of William Shakespeare, in 10 volumes; and the Collected works of Nicholas Boileau, in 5 volumes.

The Palace complex including Library were utterly devastated by Nazi Germans during World War II. In 1945 it didn't even have a roof, which was reconstructed in the following years. Until 1989 during the Communist rule, the complex served as government offices and archives. After the collapse of the Soviet Empire the Palace and the Library buildings were made into a museum incorporated as part of the Warsaw Royal Castle. It went through further restoration between 2004–2008 and at present, its spacious rooms serve as convention and exhibition pavilions.

See also 
 Załuski Library

References

External links 
 "Biblioteka Stanisława A. Poniatowskiego" (The Library of Stanisław August Poniatowski), Wirtualna Historia Książki i Bibliotek, Kraków, 2006
 The Royal Library at Zamek-krolewski.pl official website

Buildings and structures in Warsaw